Fengloucun (Chinese: 冯娄村) is a metro station on Line 8 of the Hangzhou Metro in China. Opened on 28 June 2021, it is located in the Qiantang District of Hangzhou. In the future planning it will connect the Qiantang Railway Station.

References 

Hangzhou Metro stations
Railway stations in China opened in 2021